The Hanging Gardens, in Mumbai, also known as Pherozeshah Mehta Gardens, are terraced gardens perched at the top of Malabar Hill, on its western side, just opposite the Kamala Nehru Park. They provide sunset views over the Arabian Sea and feature numerous hedges carved into the shapes of animals. The park was designed and laid out in 1881 by Ulhas Ghapokar over Bombay's main reservoir, some say to cover the water from the potentially contaminating activity of the nearby Towers of Silence. When seen from the air, the walkway inside the park (Hanging Gardens Path), spell out the letters PMG (Pherozeshah Mehta Gardens) in cursive.

Gallery

References

External links 

 Complete Guide to Mumbai 
 Local 109 in Mumbai: Malabar Hill
 Bharatonline: Hanging Gardens of Mumbai

Parks in Mumbai
Gardens in India
Terraced gardens
1881 establishments in British India